Kristýna Pastulová (born October 22, 1985) is a volleyball player from the Czech Republic. She represented the Czech Republic national team at the 2009 Women's European Volleyball Championship.

Clubs

References

External links
 CEV Player Information
 mkkontakt.cz

1985 births
Czech women's volleyball players
Living people
Expatriate volleyball players in Austria
Czech expatriate sportspeople in Austria